The 1998–99 League of Wales was the seventh season of the League of Wales, the top division of Welsh football. It began on 22 August 1998 and ended on 1 May 1999. The league was won for a record fourth consecutive season by Barry Town.

Just 17 clubs competed in the league this season, as the 18th club Ebbw Vale (who had finished third the previous season) were expelled from the league before the season began due to financial difficulties, and promptly went out of business.

Teams

Managerial changes

League table

Results

Top goalscorers

See also
1998–99 in Welsh football
1998–99 Welsh Cup
1998–99 Welsh League Cup
1998–99 FAW Premier Cup

References

External links
Official Welsh Premier League website
Welsh Football Data Archive website
Welsh Premier Football website

Cymru Premier seasons
1998–99 in Welsh football leagues
Wales